Volcom Entertainment, officially founded in 1995, in Big Bear, California, and currently based in Costa Mesa, CA is the brainchild of Volcom founder Richard Woolcott and theLINE's singer/guitarist Ryan Immegart. Ryan being Volcom's first sponsored snowboarder and having a love for music provided the necessary components to launch the label through Volcom. Being a brand recognized worldwide for its youth lifestyle clothing allowed Volcom the perfect chance to introduce theLINE's "self-titled" debut CD within the surf/skate/snow community.

In the next several years the label continued to grow through traditional and nontraditional record retail, launching bands such as CKY, Vaux, and Pepper. A 100% owned subsidiary of Volcom, some of their best-known artists today include Pepper, Valient Thorr, Riverboat Gamblers, Year Long Disaster and Guttermouth. Volcom Ent. produced the "Volcom Stage" on the Vans Warped Tour for 10 years and in 2007 began their own annual international tour, simply called "The Volcom Tour". In 2008 they launched a subscription based vinyl record club coined "VEVC (Volcom Ent Vinyl Club)" which delivers subscribers collectable vinyl singles all over the world bi-monthly. They have also created an annual music competition for unsigned rock bands called the “Band Joust”.

Bands

Current bands 
Birds of Avalon
Con$umer$
Die Hunns
Kandi Coded
Riverboat Gamblers
Goons of Doom
The Lovely Bad Things
theLINE
Totimoshi
Torche
Tweak Bird
Sexty Sexers
Valient Thorr
Year Long Disaster
Sounder
Pepper
Spoonfed

Former bands
Another Damn Disappointment (A.D.D.)
Arkham
Arraya
ASG
Bueno
cKy
Generic
Guttermouth
Vaux

See also 
 List of record labels

External links

American record labels
Companies based in Newport Beach, California